John Jaumard  was Anglican priest in Ireland in the mid 18th century.

Of French descent, Jaumard was born in Arundel and educated at Clare College, Cambridge.  He was ordained deacon on 20 December 1719, and priest on 13 March 1720... He held livings at Frome St Quintin, Ardmore and Ringagonagh. He was Archdeacon of Lismore from 1749 until his death in 1751. He was buried at Youghal.

References

Alumni of Clare College, Cambridge
Archdeacons of Lismore
1751 deaths
18th-century Irish Anglican priests
People from Arundel
English people of French descent